Sport Clube Melgacense (abbreviated as SC Melgacense) is a Portuguese football club based in Melgaço in the district of Viana do Castelo.

Background
SC Melgacense currently plays in the Terceira Divisão Série A which is the fourth tier of Portuguese football. The club was founded in 1957 and they play their home matches at the Centro de Estágios de Melgaço in Melgaço. The stadium can accommodate 1,200 spectators.

The club is affiliated to Associação de Futebol de Viana do Castelo and has entered the national cup competition known as Taça de Portugal on a few occasions.

Season to season

Honours
AF Viana do Castelo 1ª Divisão de Honra: 2009/10

Footnotes

External links
Official website 

Football clubs in Portugal
Association football clubs established in 1957
1957 establishments in Portugal
Sport in Melgaço, Portugal